Millbury Memorial Junior/Senior High School is a public school in Millbury, Massachusetts, serving students in grades seven through twelve. The school was founded in 1851.

History
Millbury Memorial Junior/Senior High School was founded in 1851 on the site of Millbury Academy. Millbury High was originally located on 130 Elm Street, which is now occupied by the Mary Elizabeth McGrath Educational Center. In 1913, renovations took place.

In 1952, Millbury High moved to its current location at 12 Martin Street, housing grades nine through twelve, and later included grades seven and eight. The school was then also dedicated as a memorial to local World War II veterans.

In 2003, the Millbury High building was renovated and expanded. During that time, grade seven temporarily moved to Raymond E. Shaw Elementary School, while grades eight through twelve remained in place. After renovations finished, grades seven and eight were given their own wing of the school, separate from the rest of the grades.

Athletics
Home of the Woolies, Millbury athletic teams primarily sport the colors of maroon, gold, and white, as well as some gold. Current sport offerings at the school include: basketball, cheerleading, cross country, football, golf, soccer, and volleyball.

Michael Favulli is known to have coached sports at Millbury High.

In 1996, Erin Dromgoole of Millbury High was the female recipient of the Wendy's High School Heisman for that year.

Notable alumni
Michael O. Moore, member of the Massachusetts Senate
Albert L. Nash, member of the Massachusetts House of Representatives

See also
List of high schools in Massachusetts

References

External links
Official website

Educational institutions established in 1851
Schools in Worcester County, Massachusetts
Public high schools in Massachusetts
Buildings and structures in Millbury, Massachusetts